Priscila Marques (born May 17, 1978 in Santos (São Paulo)) is a female judoka from Brazil, who won the bronze medal in the heavyweight division (+ 78 kg) at the 1999 Pan American Games. She represented her native country at the 2000 Summer Olympics in Sydney, Australia, where she was eliminated in the second round.

References
  Profile

1978 births
Living people
Judoka at the 1999 Pan American Games
Judoka at the 2000 Summer Olympics
Olympic judoka of Brazil
Brazilian female judoka
Pan American Games bronze medalists for Brazil
Pan American Games medalists in judo
Medalists at the 1999 Pan American Games
20th-century Brazilian women
21st-century Brazilian women